The 754th Tank Battalion was an independent tank battalion that participated in the Pacific Theater of Operations with the United States Army in World War II.

References

Tank battalions of the United States Army